Alain Bieri (born 13 March 1979 in Switzerland) is a Swiss professional football referee. He has been a full international for FIFA since 2011.

References

External links
 Profile on Swiss Football Association homepage
 
 

1979 births
Living people
Swiss football referees